Help Me, My Love is a 1969 Commedia all'italiana film written, directed and starred by Alberto Sordi.

Plot  
Giovanni and Raffaella are happily married from ten years, but their relationship goes into crisis when Raffaella falls in love with Valerio Mantovani, a handsome forty-year-old man she knew during the concerts of chamber music she weekly attends with her mother.

Cast  
 Alberto Sordi as Giovanni Machiavelli
 Monica Vitti as Raffaella
 Silvano Tranquilli as Valerio Mantovani
 Laura Adani as Elena
 Ugo Gregoretti as Michele Parodi
 Mariolina Cannuli as Danila Parodi 
 Nestor Garay as Father Bardella 
 Karl-Otto Alberty as Bauer

Reception
Sordi and Vitti were the previous season's biggest box office stars in Italy and the film was the number one film in Rome in its opening weekend, grossing $18,500.

References

External links
 

1969 films
1969 comedy films
Films directed by Alberto Sordi
Films scored by Piero Piccioni
Commedia all'italiana
Films set in Rome
1960s Italian-language films
1960s Italian films